Nils Jacobsson (10 February 1929 – 18 July 1982) was a Swedish weightlifter. He competed in the men's bantamweight event at the 1952 Summer Olympics.

References

1929 births
1982 deaths
Swedish male weightlifters
Olympic weightlifters of Sweden
Weightlifters at the 1952 Summer Olympics
Sportspeople from Karlstad